Airto Guimorvan Moreira (born August 5, 1941) is a Brazilian jazz drummer and percussionist. He is married to jazz singer Flora Purim, and their daughter Diana Moreira is also a singer. Coming to prominence in the late 1960s as a member of the Brazilian ensemble Quarteto Novo, he moved to the United States and worked in jazz fusion with Miles Davis and Return to Forever.

Biography

Airto Moreira was born in Itaiópolis, Brazil, into a family of folk healers, and raised in Curitiba and São Paulo. Showing an extraordinary talent for music at a young age, he became a professional musician at age 13, noticed first as a member of the samba jazz pioneers Sambalanço Trio and for his landmark recording with Hermeto Pascoal in Quarteto Novo in 1967. Shortly after, he followed his wife Flora Purim to the United States.

After moving to the US, Moreira studied with Moacir Santos in Los Angeles. He then moved to New York where he began playing regularly with jazz musicians, including the bassist Walter Booker. Through Booker, Moreira began playing with Joe Zawinul, who in turn introduced him to Miles Davis. At this time Davis was experimenting with electronic instruments and rock and funk rhythms, a form which would soon come to be called jazz fusion. Moreira was to participate in several of the most important projects of this emerging musical form. He stayed with Davis for about two years.

Shortly after leaving Davis, Moreira joined other Davis alumni Zawinul, Wayne Shorter and Miroslav Vitous in their group Weather Report, playing percussion on their first album (1971). He left Weather Report (replaced by Dom Um Romão and Muruga Booker for their Sweetnighter album) to join fellow Davis alumnus Chick Corea's new band Return to Forever. He played drums on Return to Forever's first two albums: Return to Forever and Light as a Feather in 1972.

Moreira was a contributor to many of Grateful Dead percussionist Mickey Hart's world music/percussion albums in Rykodisc's The World collection, including The Apocalypse Now Sessions, Däfos, Supralingua, and Planet Drum, which won a World Music Grammy in 1991. He can be heard playing congas on Eumir Deodato's 1970s space-funk hit "Also sprach Zarathustra" on the album Prelude.

Moreira has played with many of the greatest names in jazz including Cannonball Adderley, Lee Morgan, Paul Desmond, Dave Holland, Jack DeJohnette, John McLaughlin, Keith Jarrett, Al Di Meola, Zakir Hussain, George Duke and Mickey Hart.

In addition to jazz concerts and recordings, he has composed and contributed music to film and television (including scores for Apocalypse Now and Last Tango in Paris), played at the re-opening of the Library of Alexandria, Egypt (along with fellow professor of ethnomusicology Halim El-Dabh), and taught at UCLA and the California Brazil Camp.

In 1996, Moreira and his wife Flora Purim collaborated with P.M. Dawn on the song "Non-Fiction Burning" for the AIDS benefit album Red Hot + Rio, produced by the Red Hot Organization.

Awards
 Moreira was voted the number one percussionist in "Down Beat Magazine's Critics Poll" for the years 1975 through 1982 and most recently in 1993.
 In September 2002, Brazil's President Fernando Henrique Cardoso added Moreira and Purim to the "Order of Rio Branco", one of Brazil's highest honors.

Discography

As leader
 Natural Feelings (Buddah, 1970)
 Seeds On the Ground (Buddah, 1971)
 Free (CTI, 1972)
 Fingers  (CTI, 1973)
 Virgin Land (Salvation, 1974)
 In Concert with Eumir Deodato (CTI, 1974)
 Identity (Arista, 1975)
 Promises of the Sun (Arista, 1976)
 I'm Fine, How Are You? (Warner Bros., 1977)
 Touching You...Touching Me (Warner Bros., 1979)
 Däfos with Mickey Hart (Reference, 1983)
 Misa Espiritual (Harmonia Mundi, 1983)
 Latino/Aqui Se Puede (Sobocode, 1984)
 Three-Way Mirror (Reference, 1985)
 Humble People with Flora Purim (Concord Jazz, 1985)
 The Magicians with Flora Purim (Crossover, 1986)
 The Colours of Life with Flora Purim (In+Out, 1988)
 Samba de Flora (Montuno, 1989)
 The Sun Is Out with Flora Purim (Crossover, 1987)
 Struck by Lightning (Venture, 1989)
 The Other Side of This (Rykodisc, 1992)
 Killer Bees (B&W Music, 1993)
 Homeless (M.E.L.T., 2000)
 Revenge of the Killer Bees (M.E.L.T., 2000)
 Life After That (Narada, 2003)
 The Boston Three Party with Chick Corea, Eddie Gomez (Stretch, 2007)
 Alue (Selo 2017)

With Sambalanço Trio
 Sambalanço Trio (Audio Fidelity, 1964)
 Improviso Negro (Ubatuqui, 1965)
 Reencontro com Sambalanço Trio (Som Maior, 1965)

With Fourth World
 Recorded Live At Ronnie Scott's Club (Ronnie Scotts Jazz House 1992)
 Fourth World (B and W Music 1993)
 Encounters of the Fourth World (B and W Music 1995)
 Live in South Africa 1993 (Bootleg.net 1996)
 Last Journey (M.E.L.T. 2000)
 Return Journey (Electro M.E.L.T. 2000)

As sideman
With Cannonball Adderley
 The Black Messiah (Capitol, 1971)
 The Happy People (Capitol, 1972)
 Phenix (Fantasy, 1975)
 Big Man: The Legend of John Henry (Fantasy, 1975)
 Music You All (Capitol, 1976)
 Lovers (Fantasy, 1976)

With Gato Barbieri
 El Pampero (Flying Dutchman, 1972)
 Bolivia (Flying Dutchman, 1973)
 Under Fire (Flying Dutchman, 1973)
 El Gato (Flying Dutchman, 1975)

With Stanley Clarke
 Stanley Clarke (Nemperor, 1974)
 I Wanna Play for You (Nemperor, 1979)
 Shieldstone (Bellaphon, 1987)

With Chick Corea
 Return to Forever (ECM, 1972)
 Light as a Feather (Polydor, 1973)
 Secret Agent (Polydor, 1978)
 Tap Step (Warner Bros., 1980)
 The Ultimate Adventure (Stretch, 2006)

With Miles Davis
 Miles Davis at Fillmore (Columbia, 1970)
 Live-Evil (Columbia, 1971)
 Black Beauty: Live at the Fillmore West (CBS/Sony, 1973)
 Get Up with It (Columbia, 1974)
 Big Fun (Columbia, 1974)
 Circle in the Round (Columbia, 1979)
 Directions (Columbia, 1981)

With Paul Desmond
 From the Hot Afternoon (A&M, 1969)
 Summertime (A&M, 1969)
 Bridge Over Troubled Water (A&M, 1970)

With George Duke
 Feel (MPS/BASF, 1974)
 I Love the Blues, She Heard My Cry (MPS/BASF, 1975)
 The Aura Will Prevail (MPS/BASF, 1975)
 Liberated Fantasies (MPS, 1976)
 A Brazilian Love Affair (Epic, 1980)
 Night After Night (Elektra, 1989)
 Snapshot (Warner Bros., 1992)
 Is Love Enough? (Warner Bros., 1997)
 Duke (BPM, 2005)
 In a Mellow Tone (BPM, 2006)

With David Friesen
 Amber Skies (Palo Alto, 1984)
 Other Times Other Places (Global Pacific, 1989)
 Departure (Global Pacific, 1990)
 Ancient Kings (Shamrock, 1994)

With Stan Getz
 Captain Marvel (Columbia, 1975)
 The Best of Two Worlds (Columbia, 1976)

With Astrud Gilberto
 I Haven't Got Anything Better to Do (Verve, 1969)
 Gilberto with Turrentine (CTI, 1971)
 Now (Perception, 1972)

With Johnny Hammond
 Breakout (Kudu, 1971)
 Wild Horses Rock Steady (Kudu, 1972)
 The Prophet (Kudu, 1972)

With Mickey Hart
 The Apocalypse Now Sessions (Passport, 1980)
 At the Edge (Rykodisc, 1990)
 Planet Drum (Rykodisc, 1991)
 Mickey Hart's Mystery Box (1996)
 Supralingua (Rykodisc, 1998)

With Freddie Hubbard
 First Light (CTI, 1971)
 Sky Dive (CTI, 1972)
 The Baddest Hubbard (CTI, 1972)
 Polar AC (CTI, 1975)

With Bob James
 H (Tappan Zee, 1980)
 Snowbird (Tappan Zee/Columbia, 1980)
 Sign of the Times (Tappan Zee/Columbia, 1981)

With Antonio Carlos Jobim
 Stone Flower (CTI, 1970)
 Jobim (MCA, 1973)

With Hubert Laws
 Afro-Classic (CTI, 1970)
 The Rite of Spring (CTI, 1972)
 Wild Flower (Atlantic, 1972)

With Duke Pearson
 How Insensitive (Blue Note, 1969)
 Merry Ole Soul (Blue Note, 1969)
 I Don't Care Who Knows It (Blue Note, 1996)

With Flora Purim
 Butterfly Dreams (Milestone, 1973)
 Stories to Tell (Milestone, 1974)
 500 Miles High (Milestone, 1976)
 Open Your Eyes You Can Fly (Milestone, 1976)
 Encounter (Milestone, 1977)
 Nothing Will Be As It Was...Tomorrow (Warner Bros., 1977)
 That's What She Said (Milestone, 1978)
 Everyday Everynight (Warner Bros., 1978)
 Carry On (Warner Bros., 1979)
 The Midnight Sun (Venture, 1988)
 Speed of Light (B&W Music, 1995)
 Welcome Back '95 (B&W Music, 1995)
 Perpetual Emotion (Narada, 2001)
 If You Will (Strut, 2022)

With Wayne Shorter
 Super Nova (Blue Note, 1969)
 Native Dancer (Columbia, 1975)
 High Life (Verve, 1995)

With Paul Simon
 Paul Simon (Columbia, 1971)
 There Goes Rhymin' Simon (Columbia, 1973)
 Hearts and Bones (Warner Bros., 1983)

With Stanley Turrentine
 Salt Song (CTI, 1971)
 The Baddest Turrentine (CTI, 1973)
 The Sugar Man (CTI, 1975)

With Grover Washington Jr.
 Inner City Blues (Kudu, 1971)
 All the King's Horses (Kudu, 1972)
 Soul Box (Kudu, 1973)

With others
 Average White Band, Feel No Fret (Atlantic, 1979)
 George Benson, White Rabbit (CTI, 1972)
 George Benson, Take Five (Columbia, 1993)
 Luiz Bonfa, Jacaranda (Ranwood, 1973)
 Luiz Bonfa, Sanctuary (Sony, 2000)
 Soledad Bravo, Soledad Bravo (Sono-Rodven, 1985)
 Brecker Brothers, Detente (Arista, 1980)
 Dee Dee Bridgewater, Just Family (Elektra, 1978)
 Kenny Burrell, God Bless the Child  (CBS, 1971)
 Charlie Byrd, For All We Know (Columbia, 1971)
 Donald Byrd, Electric Byrd (Blue Note, 1970)
 Donald Byrd, Kofi (Blue Note, 1995)
 The Carpenters, Lovelines (A&M, 1989)
 Karen Carpenter, Karen Carpenter (A&M, 1996)
 Oscar Castro-Neves, Live at Blue Note Tokyo (CT Music 2009)
 Danilo Caymmi, Cheiro Verde Ana (Terra, 1977)
 Chicago, Chicago 13 (Columbia, 1979)
 Billy Cobham, Drum 'n' Voice 2 (Nicolosi, 2006)
 Michel Colombier, Michel Colombier (Chrysalis, 1979)
 Norman Connors, Dance of Magic (Cobblestone, 1972)
 Hank Crawford, Help Me Make it Through the Night  (Kudu, 1972)
 Al Di Meola, Cielo e Terra (Manhattan, 1985)
 Al Di Meola, Soaring Through a Dream (Manhattan, 1985)
 Eumir Deodato, Prelude  (CBS, 1973)
 Eumir Deodato, The Crossing (Soul Trade, 2011)
 Depeche Mode, Exciter (Mute, 2001)
 Depeche Mode, Freelove (Mute, 2001)
 Joao Donato, Donato Deodato (Muse, 1973)
 Christy Doran, Shaman (M.E.L.T., 2000)
 Gil Evans, Where Flamingos Fly (Artists House, 1981)
 Joe Farrell, Outback (CTI, 1971)
 Joe Farrell, Night Dancing (Warner Bros., 1978)
 Reinhard Flatischler, Layers of Time (Intuition, 1996)
 Frank Foster, The Loud Minority (Mainstream, 1972)
 Dizzy Gillespie, Live at the Royal Festival Hall (Enja, 1990)
 Dizzy Gillespie, Rhythmstick (CTI, 1990)
 Egberto Gismonti, Trem Caipira (EMI, 1985)
 Jim Hall, Where Would I Be? (Milestone, 1972)
 Lani Hall, Double or Nothing (A&M, 1979)
 Herbie Hancock, Dis Is da Drum (Mercury, 1994)
 Joe Henderson, Black Is the Color (Milestone, 1972)
 Terumasa Hino, Double Rainbow (CBS/Sony, 1981)
 Paul Horn, Brazilian Images (Black Sun, 1991)
 Toninho Horta, Terra Dos Passaros (EMI, 1980)
 Bobby Hutcherson, Color Schemes (Landmark, 1986)
 Jackie & Roy, Time & Love (CTI, 1972)
 Keith Jarrett, Expectations (Columbia, 1972)
 Alphonso Johnson, Moonshadows (Epic, 1976)
 Alphonso Johnson, Metaphors (Embamba Music, 2017)
 J. J. Johnson and Kai Winding, Betwixt & Between (A&M/CTI, 1969)
 Chaka Khan, Chaka (Warner Bros., 1978)
 Masabumi Kikuchi, Susto (CBS/Sony, 1981)
 Masabumi Kikuchi, One-Way Traveller (CBS/Sony, 1982)
 John Klemmer, Arabesque (ABC, 1978)
 John Klemmer, Brazilia (ABC, 1979)
 Steve Kuhn, Steve Kuhn (Buddah, 1971)
 Madala Kunene, Kon'Ko Man (B&W Music, 1996)
 Nils Landgren, Paint It Blue (ACT 1996)
 Indra Lesmana, For Earth and Heaven (Zebra, 1986)
 Edu Lobo, Sergio Mendes Presents Lobo (A&M, 1970)
 The Manhattan Transfer, The Chick Corea Songbook (2009)
 Rick Margitza, Color (Blue Note, 1989)
 Rick Margitza, Hope (Blue Note, 1991)
 Tania Maria, Forbidden Colors (Capitol, 1988)
 Cesar Camargo Mariano, Octeto De Cesar Camargo Mariano (Som Maior, 1965)
 Charlie Mariano, Mirror (Atlantic, 1972)
 Gary McFarland, Today (Skye, 1970)
 John McLaughlin, My Goal's Beyond (Douglas, 1971)
 Gary Meek, Gary Meek (Lipstick, 1991)
 Sergio Mendes, Primal Roots (A&M, 1972)
 Joni Mitchell, Don Juan's Reckless Daughter (Asylum, 1977)
 Milton Nascimento, Courage (A&M, 1969)
 Milton Nascimento, Milton (A&M, 1976)
 Jose Neto, Mountains and the Sea (Water Lily, 1986)
 Jose Neto, In Memory of Thunder (B&W Music, 1996)
 Lee Oskar, My Road Our Road (Avenue, 1981)
 Lee Oskar, Reflections (Tokuma, 1999)
 Babatunde Olatunji, Dance to the Beat of My Drum (Blue Heron, 1986)
 Babatunde Olatunji, Drums of Passion (Rykodisc, 1988)
 Hermeto Pascoal, Hermeto (Cobblestone, 1970)
 Hermeto Pascoal, Slaves Mass (Warner Bros., 1977)
 Annette Peacock, I'm the One (RCA Victor, 1972)
 Ivo Perelman, Ivo (King, 1989)
 Esther Phillips, From a Whisper to a Scream (Kudu, 1971)
 David Pomeranz, Time to Fly (Decca, 1971)
 Michel Portal, Birdwatcher (Sunnyside, 2007)
 Quarteto Novo, Quarteto Novo (EMI, 1993)
 Dianne Reeves, Dianne Reeves (Blue Note, 1987)
 Dianne Reeves, Quiet After the Storm (Blue Note, 1994)
 Lawson Rollins, Infinita (Infinita 2008)
 Lawson Rollins, Espirito (2010)
 Charlie Rouse, Two Is One (Strata-East, 1974)
 Santana, Borboletta (Columbia, 1974)
 Santana, Dance of the Rainbow Serpent (Columbia, 1995)
 Seawind, Seawind (A&M, 1980)
 Don Sebesky, Giant Box (CTI, 1973)
 Lonnie Smith, Mama Wailer (Kudu, 1971)
 Raul de Souza, Sweet Lucy (Capitol, 1977)
 Raul de Souza, Don't Ask My Neighbors (Capitol, 1978)
 James Taylor, That's Why I'm Here (Columbia, 1985)
 Buddy Terry, Pure Dynamite (Mainstream, 1972)
 Leon Thomas, Blues and the Soulful Truth (Flying Dutchman, 1972)
 McCoy Tyner, 13th House (Milestone, 1982)
 Tina Turner, Rough (United Artists, 1978)
 Marcos Valle, Vontade de Rever Voce (Som Livre 1981)
 Geraldo Vandre, 5 Anos De Cancao (Som Maior, 1966)
 Miroslav Vitous, Magical Shepherd (Warner Bros., 1976)
 Narada Michael Walden, Awakening (Atlantic, 1979)
 Walter Wanderley, Moondreams (A&M/CTI, 1969)
 Leon Ware, Leon Ware (Be With 2014)
 Weather Report, Weather Report (Columbia, 1971)
 Randy Weston, Blue Moses (CTI, 1972)
 Michael White, The X Factor (Elektra, 1978)
 Lauren Wood, Cat Trick (Warner Bros., 1981)
 Peter Yarrow, Peter (Warner Bros., 1972)
 Brian Bromberg, In the Spirit of Jobim (Mack Avenue, 2012)
 Tommy Bolin, Teaser (nemperor, 1975)

Filmography
 2006:  Airto & Flora Purim: The Latin Jazz All-Stars

See also
 Mário Negrão

Sources

References

External links
 – official site

Airto Moreira biography at Europe Jazz Network
Airto Moreira interview at Clubbity
Airto Moreira interview at All About Jazz
Airto Moreira Interview for the NAMM Oral History Program

1941 births
Living people
Brazilian emigrants to the United States
People from Santa Catarina (state)
Bass drum players
Bongo players
Brazilian jazz drummers
Brazilian jazz percussionists
Brazilian percussionists
Brazilian session musicians
Castanets players
Conga players
Djembe players
Güiro players
Jazz percussionists
Latin jazz musicians
Maracas players
Marimbists
Miles Davis
Planet Drum members
Quarteto Novo members
Return to Forever members
Sambalanço Trio members
Sambrasa Trio members
Snare drummers
Tabla players
Tambourine players
Timbaleros
Triangle players
Tubular bells players
American jazz vibraphonists
Weather Report members
Ilk Records artists
Skye Records artists
CTI Records artists